James W. "J.W." Krumpholz (born September 22, 1987) is an American water polo player. He is a member of the United States men's national water polo team at the 2008 Beijing Olympics. In the championship game, the USA team won the silver medal, defeated by Hungary.

Krumpholz was born in Orange County, California. He attended Foothill High School in Tustin, California, and moved on to the University of Southern California. Krumpholz's father, Kurt Krumpholz, is a former world-record holder in the 400-meter freestyle.

Awards and honors
His USC Trojans men's water polo team won the 2008 National Collegiate Men's Water Polo Championship on December 7, 2008, at the Avery Aquatics Center, Stanford, California. The team beat Stanford, 7-5. Krumpholz was named the MVP of the NCAA Tournament.

He, UCLA senior Krsto Sbutega, and Stanford's Jimmie Sandman were the three finalists for the 2009 Peter J. Cutino Award, an accolade presented annually to the outstanding female and male collegiate water polo players in the United States.

Krumpholz and fellow Trojan Kami Craig won the 2009 awards.

See also
 List of Olympic medalists in water polo (men)

References

External links
 
 USC player bio

1987 births
Living people
American male water polo players
Water polo centre forwards
USC Trojans men's water polo players
Water polo players at the 2008 Summer Olympics
Medalists at the 2008 Summer Olympics
Olympic silver medalists for the United States in water polo
Water polo players at the 2011 Pan American Games
Pan American Games medalists in water polo
Pan American Games gold medalists for the United States
Medalists at the 2011 Pan American Games